Timothy Joseph Zoehrer (born 25 September 1961) is a former Australian cricket player. He played as a wicket-keeper and is of Austrian descent.

He began his career in the 1980–81 season with Western Australia in the Sheffield Shield as an understudy to Rod Marsh. After Marsh's retirement he became the number one state keeper and eventually the Australian Test keeper. He played ten Test matches between 1986 and 1987 when Australia were far from the top team in the world, touring New Zealand and India. He also played 22 One Day Internationals.

Zoehrer claims he was replaced as first-choice keeper after a personality clash with Australian coach and newly appointed selector, Bob Simpson. He was replaced firstly by Greg Dyer and then Ian Healy. Zoehrer did, though, tour England twice, in 1989 and 1993, as Healy's deputy. Zoehrer was selected as a reserve for the 1987 Cricket World Cup. He played his final One Day International in 1994, at Perth vs South Africa, seven years after his previous appearance again as a replacement for a rested Healy.

Zoehrer was a successful and popular keeper for Western Australia with a state record of 360 dismissals and also took 38 first-class wickets with his leg break bowling.  In both of his tours of England he topped the first class bowling averages for the Australians on tour, taking 1 wicket for 9 runs in 1989 and 12 wickets at an average of 20.8 in 1993. However he never bowled at Test or One Day International level. He was controversially replaced by former NSW's Adam Gilchrist at the beginning of the 1994–95 season and never played first class or list-A cricket again.

Zoehrer later played and coached cricket in the Netherlands and wrote an autobiography, "The Gloves Are Off".

Zoehrer played professional Australian rules football with Western Australian Football League (WAFL) club East Fremantle in 1982.

References

External links

1961 births
Living people
Western Australia cricketers
People educated at Trinity College, Perth
Australia One Day International cricketers
Australia Test cricketers
East Fremantle Football Club players
Australian rules footballers from Perth, Western Australia
Australian cricketers
Cricketers from Perth, Western Australia
Sportsmen from Western Australia
Scarborough Festival President's XI cricketers
Australian people of Austrian descent
Wicket-keepers